Littlefield Independent School District is a public school district based in Littlefield, Texas (USA).

In 2009, the school district was rated "academically acceptable" by the Texas Education Agency.

Schools
Littlefield Independent School District Home Page
Littlefield High School (Grades 9-12)
Littlefield Junior High (Grades 6-8)
Littlefield Elementary (Grades 3-5)
Littlefield Primary (Grades PK-2)

References

External links
Littlefield ISD

School districts in Lamb County, Texas